Lamasón is a municipality located in the autonomous community of Cantabria, Spain. According to the 2007 census, the city has a population of 338 inhabitants. Its capital is Sobrelapeña.

Towns
Burió
Cires
Lafuente
Los Pumares
Quintanilla
Río
Sobrelapeña (capital)
Venta Fresnedo

References

External links
Lamasón - Cantabria 102 Municipios

Municipalities in Cantabria